The Bull-Dogger is a 1922 American five-reel silent Western film starring Bill Pickett, an African American and Native American who is credited with inventing bulldogging or steer wrestling. It was filmed on location in Boley, Oklahoma. The film is presumed to be lost with only fragments known to have survived.

Cast
 Bill Pickett
 Bennie Turpin
 Anita Bush
 Steve Reynolds

References

External links
 
 
 
 

1922 films
1922 Western (genre) films
1922 lost films
American black-and-white films
Films shot in Oklahoma
Lost American films
Lost Western (genre) films
Okfuskee County, Oklahoma
Silent American Western (genre) films
1920s American films